The 1981 Kent State Golden Flashes football team was an American football team that represented Kent State University in the Mid-American Conference (MAC) during the 1981 NCAA Division I-A football season. In their first season under head coach Ed Chlebek, the Golden Flashes compiled a 4–7 record (3–6 against MAC opponents), finished in seventh place in the MAC, and were outscored by all opponents by a combined total of 172 to 144.

The team's statistical leaders included Ron Pittman with 648 rushing yards, Bill Willows with 913 passing yards, and Todd Feldman with 470 receiving yards. Two Kent State players were selected as first-team All-MAC players: defensive back Charlie Grandjean and linebacker Russ Hedderly.

Schedule

References

Kent State
Kent State Golden Flashes football seasons
Kent State Golden Flashes football